UFC on ESPN: The Korean Zombie vs. Ige  (also known as UFC on ESPN 25 and UFC Vegas 29) was a mixed martial arts event produced by the Ultimate Fighting Championship that took place on June 19, 2021 at the UFC Apex facility in Enterprise, Nevada, part of the Las Vegas Metropolitan Area, United States.

Background
A featherweight bout between former UFC Featherweight Championship challenger Chan Sung Jung and Dan Ige served as the event headliner.

A welterweight bout between Tim Means and Danny Roberts was briefly linked to the event. However, Roberts was removed from the pairing by the promotion in the days leading up to the event due to COVID-19 protocols, while Means was rebooked a week later against Nicolas Dalby.

A flyweight bout between Tagir Ulanbekov and Tyson Nam was expected to take place at the event. However, the bout was never officially announced by the promotion and the matchup did not take place on the card due to a recent undisclosed illness for Ulanbekov.

Results

Bonus awards
The following fighters received $50,000 bonuses.
 Fight of the Night: Marlon Vera vs. Davey Grant
 Performance of the Night: Seung Woo Choi and Matt Brown

See also 

 List of UFC events
 List of current UFC fighters
 2021 in UFC

References 

UFC on ESPN
2021 in mixed martial arts
June 2021 sports events in the United States
2021 in sports in Nevada
Mixed martial arts in Las Vegas
Sports competitions in Las Vegas